Kaufland is a German hypermarket chain, part of the Schwarz Gruppe which also owns Lidl. The hypermarket directly translates to English as 'buy-land'. It opened its first store in 1984 in Neckarsulm and quickly expanded to become a major chain in what was formerly East Germany. It operates over 1,400 stores in Germany, the Czech Republic, Slovakia, Poland, Romania, Bulgaria, Croatia and Moldova.

History

The history of Kaufland began when Joseph Schwarz entered the Südfrüchte Großhandlung Lidl & Co. company as a shareholder in 1930, which was then renamed Lidl & Schwarz KG. The company expanded its range from fruit to a food and goods wholesaler.

After World War II, the company was rebuilt: in 1954 it moved into its own property in Heilbronn and joined the A & O retail chain. With Handels- und Fruchthof Heilbronn GmbH the first regional warehouse was opened in northern Württemberg. In 1964, the company expanded its range of products by opening a meat department. 

In 1968 the first Handelshof discount store was opened in Backnang, and in 1977 at the same place a hypermarket of the same name was established. After the death of Joseph Schwarz in 1977 his son Dieter Schwarz took over the management of the company. Taking the name of his father's former business partner, he introduced the Lidl chain which were primarily discount stores and they quickly grew into 30 stores. As an alternative to these stores, he developed Kaufland. In 1984 the first Kaufland hypermarket was opened.

After the reunification of Germany the Kaufland chain expanded into the Eastern German states and opened numerous markets. The first East German Kaufland store was opened in Meissen in 1990. In 1998, the first department store outside of Germany was established in the Czech Republic. In the 2000s, the company established branches in Slovakia (since 2000), Croatia (2001), Poland (2001), Romania (2005), Bulgaria (2006) and Moldova (2018).

In 2006 and 2007, other store openings followed in Germany and Kaufland also took over shares of competitors. In February 2009 the corporation claimed to have 73,000 employees in Germany.

In January 2010, it was announced that Karl Lupus GmbH & Co. KG was cleared by antitrust authorities to sell their 12 stores of the famila Handels-Betriebe GmbH & Co. KG Rhein-Neckar and the Cash-&-Carry-Markt Lupus Food Service with 1,400 employees to Kaufland.

In January 2010, the Kaufland group had purchased all five Schleckerland drug stores in Ehingen, Geislingen, Tempe, Neu-Ulm, Schwäbisch Gmünd and all but the Neu-Ulm store had been converted to the Kaufland brand by then. The local Schleckerland was closed down because Kaufland was already present in Neu-Ulm.

From 2011 onward, all Handelshof stores were to be gradually be converted to the Kaufland brand and to be partly rebuilt and enlarged.

In November 2016, Kaufland's parent company applied for Kaufland trademarks in Australia. In September 2019, Kaufland announced plans to open 20 stores in Australia. In January 2020, Kaufland announced it would leave Australia, two years after buying its first store and six months after starting work on its distribution centre. It had invested about 310 million euro and hired over 200 staff members but never opened a store. The first stores were originally expected to open in 2019 but the launch date had been pushed back to 2021.

On 26 September 2019, the first two Moldovan stores were opened in the capital city of Chișinău. Construction of the fourth Moldovan store have started on 23 July 2020, in the southern city of Comrat. The beginning of construction at the fifth Moldovan store in the city of Ungheni was announced on 6 October 2020.

Operations

Gallery

References

External links
  
 Kaufland Bulgaria 
 Kaufland Croatia 
 Kaufland Czech Republic 
 Kaufland Poland 
 Kaufland Romania 
 Kaufland Slovakia 
 Kaufland Moldova 
 EBRD supports Kaufland's expansion in eastern Europe

Companies based in Baden-Württemberg
German companies established in 1984
Retail companies established in 1984
Companies based in Neckarsulm
Supermarkets of Bulgaria
Supermarkets of Croatia
Supermarkets of the Czech Republic
Supermarkets of Germany
Supermarkets of Poland
Supermarkets of Romania
German brands